is an Italian Christmas carol composed by Pietro Yon in 1917. The melody was used by Frederick H. Martens in his English language carol "When Blossoms Flowered 'mid the Snows". The melody and lyrics of the chorus are derived from the chorus of "Adeste Fideles" (O Come All Ye Faithful).

The music historian Salvatore Basile notes: "The song would achieve the near-impossible feat of surviving in the standard holiday repertoire, with important performances, innumerable recordings, and every kind of vocal and instrumental arrangement."

Lyrics

See also
 List of Christmas carols

References

Sources
 Martens translation, Wikisource
Gesu Bambino lyrics and MIDI

Italian-language Christmas carols
Italian Christian hymns
1917 songs